Hiram Percy Maxim  (September 2, 1869 – February 17, 1936) was an American radio pioneer and inventor, and co-founder (with Clarence D. Tuska) of the American Radio Relay League (ARRL). Hiram Percy Maxim is credited with inventing and selling the first commercially successful firearm silencer, and also with developing mufflers for internal combustion engines.

Early years
He was the son of Sir Hiram Maxim, inventor of the Maxim Machine gun. He was the nephew of Hudson Maxim, an inventor of explosives and ballistic propellants. He had two sisters, Florence Maxim, who married George Albert Cutter, and Adelaide Maxim, who married Eldon Joubert, Ignace Paderewski's piano tuner.  In 1875, the family moved from Brooklyn, New York, to Fanwood, New Jersey, with his father joining the rest of the family on weekends. At age 17, Hiram was a mechanical engineering graduate, class of 1886, of the Massachusetts Institute of Technology (then a two-year course). He went to work for various electric utility companies in Boston.

Beginning in 1892, Maxim worked at the American Projectile Company of Lynn, Massachusetts, and tinkered nights on his own internal combustion engine. He admitted his ignorance of engine developments in Germany by Maybach, Daimler, and Benz, and he later explained that he "was staggered at the amount of time required to build one small engine."  Furthermore, he was appalled once he finally achieved combustion.  The engine "shook and trembled and rattled and clattered, spat oil, fire, smoke, and smell, and to a person who disliked machinery naturally, and who had been brought up to the fine elegance and perfection of fine horse carriages, it was revolting."

In early 1895, Maxim visited Colonel Albert Pope in Hartford which led to his being hired for the Motor Vehicle Division of the Pope Manufacturing Company.  His vehicle was not ready in time for the Times-Herald race in November, but Maxim was able to get to Chicago and serve as an umpire.  He rode with the Morris and Salom entry, the Electrobat II.

In 1899, with Maxim at the controls, the Pope Columbia, a gasoline-powered automobile, won the first closed-circuit automobile race in the U.S. at Branford, Connecticut.  Columbia continued to produce gasoline cars until 1913, and was also a major manufacturer of early electric automobiles and trucks.

From 1902 through 1909, Maxim was largely focused on inventing, building, marketing, and selling firearm silencers.  He also developed mufflers for internal combustion engines using much the same technology.

Marriage and family
He married Josephine Hamilton, the daughter of the former Maryland Governor William T. Hamilton December 21, 1898, in Hagerstown, Maryland. They lived in Hartford, and had a son, Hiram Hamilton Maxim, and a daughter, Percy Hamilton Maxim, who married John Glessner Lee, the grandson of John J. Glessner. The John J. Glessner House designed by Henry Hobson Richardson is now a Chicago landmark. Percy Maxim Lee (1906-2002) was president of the League of Women Voters from 1950–1958 and was appointed by President Kennedy to the Consumer Advisory Council, which she later chaired. She advocated for debates between presidential candidates and testified in the U.S. Senate against Senator Joseph McCarthy in 1955.

Accomplishments

Firearm and auto industries
Hiram Percy Maxim is usually credited with inventing and selling the first commercially successful firearm silencer around 1902, receiving a patent for it on March 30, 1909. Maxim gave his device the trademarked name Maxim Silencer, and they were regularly advertised in sporting goods magazines. The muffler for internal combustion engines was developed in parallel with the firearm silencer by Maxim in the early 20th century, using many of the same techniques to provide quieter-running engines, and in many English-speaking countries automobile mufflers are called silencers.

Radio
He created the American Radio Relay League (ARRL) in 1914 as a response to the lack of an organized group of "relay" stations to pass messages via amateur radio.  Relaying messages allowed them to be sent farther than any single station's reach at the time. He originally had the amateur call signs SNY, 1WH, 1ZM, (after World War I) 1AW, and later W1AW, which is now the ARRL Headquarters club station call sign. His rotary spark-gap transmitter "Old Betsy" has a place of honor at the ARRL Headquarters. The ARRL presents an annual award named for Maxim to a radio amateur and ARRL member under the age of 21.

Cinema
Maxim founded the Amateur Cinema League in New York in 1926; he was elected president. The Amateur Cinema League published a monthly journal, Movie Makers.

Literature
Maxim wrote the book Life's Place in the Cosmos, published in 1933, an overview of contemporary science that surmised life existed outside of earth; as well as two books published in 1936: A Genius in the Family: Sir Hiram Stevens Maxim Through a Small Son's Eyes an amusing account of his youth, and Horseless Carriage Days wherein he recounted his days as an automobile pioneer.

Death
Hiram Percy Maxim was on a trip by rail in February 1936 from his home in Hartford, Connecticut, to Flagstaff, Arizona, to visit the Lowell Observatory.  He fell ill and was taken from the train to a hospital in La Junta, Colorado, where he died the following day, February 17, 1936.  Hiram P. Maxim was buried in the Rose Hill Cemetery in Hagerstown, Maryland, in the Hamilton family plot belonging to his wife's family.

In popular culture
Maxim's aforementioned autobiography of his youth, A Genius in the Family was adapted in 1946 into a comedy-drama film produced by Universal Pictures titled, So Goes My Love while the UK release used the same title as the book. Bobby Driscoll plays Maxim in the film, with Don Ameche and Myrna Loy playing his parents, Hiram Stephens Maxim and Jane Bidden Maxim.

Patents
 : Motor vehicle (battery electric vehicle)
 : Motor vehicle running gear
 : Electric motor vehicle
 : Motor road vehicle
 : Silent Firearm Issued March 30, 1909.

Books
 Life's Place in the Cosmos, New York: D. Appleton, 1933.
 A Genius in the Family, New York: Harper, 1936.
 Horseless Carriage Days, New York: Harper, 1936.

See also
 Suppressor

Biography
 Schumacher, Alice Clink, Hiram Percy Maxim, Father of Amateur Radio, Great Falls, MT:  Schumachers, 1970.

References

External links

 
 Hiram Percy Maxim Collection, Northeast Historic Film
 The Columbia Automobile pages
 Hudson Maxim papers (1851–1925) at Hagley Museum and Library. The collection contains some correspondence from Hiram.

1869 births
1936 deaths
19th-century American inventors
20th-century American inventors
Members of the Early Birds of Aviation
Amateur radio people
American automotive pioneers
Burials at Rose Hill Cemetery (Hagerstown, Maryland)
People from Fanwood, New Jersey